Lazaro Alonso (born March 25, 1974) is an American actor. He is known for playing Tsu'tey in James Cameron's science fiction film Avatar and Fenix Calderon in the film Fast & Furious. Alonso has had roles in other films such as Jarhead, This Christmas, Miracle at St. Anna and Detroit. As of 2019, Alonso is part of the main cast of Amazon Prime Video original series The Boys (based on the comic book series of the same name) playing the character known as Marvin T. "MM (Mother's Milk)" Milk.

Early life and education
Alonso was born and raised in Washington, D.C. and is of Afro-Cuban descent. He is an alumnus of Howard University. After graduating from Howard University with a BBA in marketing, he had a career as an investment banker at Merrill Lynch on Wall Street before making his way into entertainment.

Career
Alonso began his career hosting shows on the BET network. Alonso appeared in music videos by Toni Braxton and Aaliyah.

Also has had supporting roles in films such as Stomp the Yard, Down for Life, Jarhead, G, Leprechaun: Back 2 tha Hood, This Christmas and Miracle at St. Anna.

In 2009, he played Fenix Calderon, the main antagonist in the film Fast & Furious, the fourth installment in the Fast & Furious film series. Alonso had a major role as the Na'vi warrior Tsu'tey in James Cameron's science fiction adventure film Avatar.

Alonso also played one of the lead characters on the 2011, TV series Breakout Kings during its first season and the first episode of season two.

He has made television guest starring appearances on The Unit, Bones, CSI: Miami, NCIS, The Practice and Eyes.

He was the lead in the 2013, NBC drama Deception.

Alonso also played one of the main characters, Detective Billy Soto, on the NBC series The Mysteries of Laura.

In 2023, Alonso played the protagonist of My Dad the Bounty Hunter, a dad named Terry who secretly works as a bounty hunter named Sabo Brok.

Personal life
Alonso resides in Los Angeles, California. He is a Christian.

Filmography

Film

Television

References

External links

Laz Alonso discussing NBC's Deception December 2012
 Interview with Laz Alonso, January, 2008, by Joshua Hudson, G.I. Jobs Magazine

1974 births
Living people
20th-century American male actors
21st-century American male actors
African-American male actors‎ 
American investment bankers
American male film actors
American male television actors
American people of Cuban descent
Hispanic and Latino American male actors
Howard University alumni
Male actors from Los Angeles
Male actors from Washington, D.C.
Merrill (company) people